Edwin Tong Chun Fai  (born 1969) is a Singaporean politician and lawyer who has been serving as Minister for Culture, Community and Youth and Second Minister for Law concurrently since 2020. A member of the governing People's Action Party (PAP), he has been the Member of Parliament (MP) representing the Joo Chiat division of Marine Parade GRC since 2011. 

Prior to entering politics, Tong was a lawyer at Allen & Gledhill practising extensively in corporate and commercial disputes, restructuring and insolvency matters, and international arbitration. He was appointed Senior Counsel in 2015.

Tong made his political debut in the 2011 general election as part of a four-member PAP team contesting in Moulmein–Kallang GRC and won. 

Throughout his political career, he served as Senior Minister of State for Law and Senior Minister of State for Health before being promoted to full minister after the 2020 general election.

Education 
Tong attended St. Joseph's Institution and Raffles Junior College before graduating from the National University of Singapore in 1994 with a Bachelor of Laws degree. During his time in Raffles, he was classmates with current Parliament Speaker and fellow Marine Parade GRC Member of Parliament, Tan Chuan-Jin.

Career

Legal career 
After he was admitted to the Singapore Bar, he joined Allen & Gledhill and had been a partner at the law firm until 2018. During his legal career, he practised extensively in corporate and commercial disputes, restructuring and insolvency matters, and international arbitration. He was appointed Senior Counsel in 2015.

Tong was one of the lawyers representing Kong Hee, the pastor of City Harvest Church accused of misappropriating church funds in a high-profile case. During the trial, which lasted from 2012 to 2018, a front-page headline from the Chinese tabloid Lianhe Wanbao, which had been edited to insinuate that Tong and the PAP had saved Kong from harsher penalties, appeared on social media. The original headline read "Outdated law saved [Kong and the other convicted church leaders]"; the edited headline read "PAP lawyer saved [Kong and the other convicted church leaders]". On 5 February 2018, the Attorney-General's Chambers mentioned that it would take legal action against a man responsible for publishing the image, which amounts to contempt of court.

Political career 
Before entering politics in the 2011 general election, Tong was already active in grassroots activities in various constituencies, particularly Jalan Besar GRC. In 2011, he was fielded by the People's Action Party (PAP) as part of a four-member team to contest in Moulmein–Kallang GRC. The PAP team won with 58.56% of the vote against the Workers' Party and Tong became a Member of Parliament representing the Jalan Besar ward. Between 2011 and July 2018, he was the Deputy Chairman of the Government Parliamentary Committee for Law and Home Affairs.

In the 2015 general election, Tong joined the five-member PAP team contesting in Marine Parade GRC and they won with 64.07% of the vote against the Workers' Party. He then became the Member of Parliament representing the Joo Chiat ward of Marine Parade GRC. On 1 July 2018, he was appointed Senior Minister of State at the Ministry of Law and Ministry of Health. Former Prime Minister Goh Chok Tong revealed that when Tong became a Senior Minister of State, he essentially had a 75% pay cut – down to about S$500,000 a year compared to his previous earnings of over S$2 million a year as a lawyer. Tong also served on the board of the Land Transport Authority from 2017 to 2018.

In March 2018, Tong was selected to be part of the ten-member Select Committee on Deliberate Online Falsehoods tasked with looking into the issue of deliberate online falsehoods and how to deal with them. During the public hearings, a group of activists issued a lengthy missive on 2 April 2018, stating that the hearings did not feel like a genuine attempt to solicit views and that the attendees' views had been misrepresented. One of the activists, Kirsten Han, was questioned by Tong over an article she had written for the Asia Times whose relevance to the committee's terms of reference was not made clear. Tong also quoted the first three paragraphs of a 2011 article from The Guardian, in which former British Prime Minister Tony Blair described the Freedom of Information Act as "dangerous", to question Han over the Freedom of Information Act when the rest of the article presents a different picture.

During the 2020 general election, Tong managed to retain his seat as Member of Parliament in Marine Parade GRC after the five-member PAP team won with 57.76% of the vote against the Workers' Party. On 27 July 2020, he was promoted to full Minister and appointed Minister for Culture, Community and Youth and Second Minister for Law.

Personal life 
Tong is married with three daughters. He has an active interest in football and had served in a volunteer capacity as the Vice President of the Football Association of Singapore from 2013 to 2020. He is also a Roman Catholic.

References

External links 
 Edwin Tong on Parliament of Singapore

 

People's Action Party politicians
1969 births
Living people
Singaporean Senior Counsel
National University of Singapore alumni
Raffles Junior College alumni
Saint Joseph's Institution, Singapore alumni
Singaporean Roman Catholics
Singaporean people of Cantonese descent
Members of the Parliament of Singapore
Members of the Cabinet of Singapore